"Ciao ciao Italia" is a song used as the fight song for the Swedish national team during the 1990 FIFA World Cup in Italy. The song was written by Lasse Holm and Eddie Oliva and performed by the Swedish band After Shave.

The single peaked at 12th position at the Swedish singles chart. The song also stayed at Svensktoppen for four weeks between 20 May-10 June 1990, peaking at second position.

Track listing
Ciao ciao Italia
Ciao ciao Italia - instrumental

Charts

References

1990 singles
1990 songs
Swedish songs
Swedish-language songs
Football songs and chants
Sweden national football team songs
1990 FIFA World Cup
Songs written by Lasse Holm